John Dawson, 1st Earl of Portarlington (23 August 1744 – 30 November 1798) was an Anglo-Irish politician and peer.

Dawson was the son of William Dawson, 1st Viscount Carlow and Mary Damer, daughter of Joseph Damer and sister of Joseph Damer, 1st Earl of Dorchester. 

Between 1766 and 1768 he was a Member of Parliament for Portarlington in the Irish House of Commons. In 1768 he was elected to represent Queen's County. He resigned his seat in the Commons upon succeeding to his father's peerage in 1779 and assumed his seat in the Irish House of Lords. On 21 June 1785, Dawson was created Earl of Portarlington in the Peerage of Ireland. Between 1779 and his death he was Governor of Queen's County. In 1796 he was made a member of the Privy Council of Ireland.

On 1 January 1778, he married Lady Caroline Stuart, the fifth daughter of John Stuart, 3rd Earl of Bute. Together they had five sons and four daughters. He was succeeded in his title by his eldest son, John Dawson.

References

|-

1744 births
1798 deaths
18th-century Anglo-Irish people
Earls of Portarlington
Irish MPs 1761–1768
Irish MPs 1769–1776
Irish MPs 1776–1783
Lord-Lieutenants of Queen's County
Members of the Irish House of Lords
Members of the Parliament of Ireland (pre-1801) for Portarlington
Members of the Parliament of Ireland (pre-1801) for Queen's County constituencies
Members of the Privy Council of Ireland